Sipho Caiphas "KK" Nkosi is a South African politician who has represented the African National Congress (ANC) in the KwaZulu-Natal Provincial Legislature since 2009. He has chaired the legislature's Portfolio Committee on Finance since 2014.

Political career 
Nkosi was first elected to the provincial legislature in the 2009 general election, ranked 27th on the ANC's provincial party list. He was re-elected to his seat in the 2014 general election, ranked 11th on the ANC's party list, and he was subsequently elected to chair the legislature's Portfolio Committee on Finance; his appointment was welcomed by the opposition Democratic Alliance. In the 2019 general election, he was elected to his third term in the provincial legislature, ranked 29th on the ANC's party list. He retained his position as chair of the finance committee.

References

External links 

 
 Hon. SC Nkosi at KwaZulu-Natal Provincial Legislature

Living people
Year of birth missing (living people)
Members of the KwaZulu-Natal Legislature
African National Congress politicians
21st-century South African politicians